Chidi Mokeme  (born 17 March 1972) is a Nigerian actor and reality show host. He hails from Oba in Idemili South LGA of Anambra State, South Eastern Nigeria. He was the host of Gulder Ultimate Search Reality-show.

Early life 
Chidi Mokeme  had the chance to experience the many cultures of Nigeria's major ethnic groupings. He attended Salvation Army Primary School in Surulere, Lagos, for his elementary schooling. He studied at the Federal Government College in Minna, Niger State, and then continued on to the Institute of Management and Technology (IMT) in Enugu, where he received a Higher National Diploma in Computer Science. Chidi proudly speaks Hausa, Yoruba, and his native language , Igbo, as a result. He stands out as being multi-talented because of this talent. Despite his preference for science, he has always had a strong passion for acting, and the majority of his pals are students of art.

Chidi Mokeme and Gulder Ultimate Search 
Chide was the anchor of the Television show Gulder Ultimate Search for a couple of years.

Personal life 
Jean Olumba Mokeme, is the spouse of Chidi. They exchanged vows on April 28, 2012. She was born and raised in the United States of America and currently works as a doctor and pharmacist there. They have a son,  Noah Mokeme.

The actor who launched his sex toys company in 2009 also has a son who is 17 years old. His teenage son's name is Emem Daniel Mokeme, and Adia Ukoyen is his mother. Emem was born as a result of a long-ago romance between Chidi Mokeme and Adia Ukoyen. Journalist Adia Ukoyen most recently served as Godswill Obot Akpabio's personal assistant for media matters when he was the governor of Akwa Ibom.

Filmography

See also
 List of Nigerian actors

References

External links
Chidi Mokeme at the Internet Movie Database

21st-century Nigerian male actors
Living people
Nigerian male film actors
Nigerian television personalities
Male actors in Yoruba cinema
1972 births
Nigerian male television actors
Igbo actors
People from Anambra State
Nigerian television presenters